Allan Alexander Read  (19 September 1923 – 15 November  2003) was the Anglican Bishop of Ontario from 1981 until 1992.
 
He was educated at Trinity College, Toronto and ordained Deacon in 1948; and Priest in 1949.  He was the  incumbent at Mono Mills, Ontario then Rector of Barrie. He was Archdeacon of Simcoe from 1961 to 1972; and Suffragan Bishop of Toronto from then until  his appointment as a  Diocesan.

References

Anglican archdeacons in North America
1923 births
2003 deaths
University of Toronto alumni
Academic staff of University of Windsor
20th-century Anglican Church of Canada bishops
Anglican bishops of Ontario